Sarnelli is a surname of Italian origin. Notable people with the surname include:

Adro Sarnello, Australian
Januarius Maria Sarnelli, Jesuit and an early companion of S. Alphonsus Liguori
Vincent Sarnelli (born 1962), French boxer
Vincenzo Maria Sarnelli (1835–1898), Italian Catholic bishop

Surnames of Italian origin